Barry Squires (29 July 1931 – 18 August 2017) was an English professional footballer who played as an outside left in the Football League for Birmingham City and Bradford City.

Career
Squires was born in 1931 in the Sparkhill district of Birmingham. He attended Golden Hillock Road School and captained its football team. He was a member of the Air Training Corps squadron associated with the BSA factory in Small Heath, and played for its football team, before completing his National Service with the RAF. During a lengthy posting to High Wycombe, he was able to play Isthmian League football for Wycombe Wanderers, and was selected to represent Berks & Bucks county. He was on the books of Wolverhampton Wanderers as an amateur, had trials with clubs including Portsmouth and Bristol City, and played for Lye Town, before signing professional forms with Birmingham City in May 1953.

Having to compete with Alex Govan for the outside left position meant Squires had little chance of first-team football. In February 1954, after Govan damaged a toe in training, he was in contention with Geoff Cox and Dennis Hill to start against West Ham United, but Hill was preferred. The only first-team appearance Squires made for the club was on 13 March in a 2–0 defeat away to Brentford in the Second Division, again in the absence of Govan.

He was listed for transfer at the end of the season, and joined Bradford City for a "moderate" fee. He made seven appearances in the Third Division North, and continued his career in non-league football with Yeovil Town, Gloucester City, Kidderminster Harriers, Rugby Town, and Gresley Rovers, for whom he scored once in five games playing at left half.

Squires died on 18 August 2017 at the age of 86.

References

Sources
 

1931 births
2017 deaths
Footballers from Birmingham, West Midlands
English footballers
Association football midfielders
Wycombe Wanderers F.C. players
Lye Town F.C. players
Wolverhampton Wanderers F.C. players
Birmingham City F.C. players
Bradford City A.F.C. players
Yeovil Town F.C. players
Gloucester City A.F.C. players
Kidderminster Harriers F.C. players
Rugby Town F.C. players
Gresley F.C. players
Isthmian League players
English Football League players
Southern Football League players